Statistics of American Soccer League II in season 1962–63.

League standings

References

American Soccer League II (RSSSF)

American Soccer League (1933–1983) seasons
American Soccer League, 1962-63